Magway Universityis located in Magway.

History
On June 5, 1955, the College of Magway was founded. In 1982, it was promoted to the Degree College of Magway. It was promoted to the University of Magway on December 20, 1994. From the year 2013, the degrees were given at the convocation hall, located in its campus.

Location
It is located on Taungdwin Road, in the south part of Magway. It comprises two campuses, namely the main and the extension. Generally, science students study at the main campus and art students do in the extension. Now, many new buildings, named Shwe Gant Gaw, were built. English Major specialization students are studying their lessons at Shwe Gan Gaw (1). The convocation hall, the library, the recreation centre and the research centre are located in the extension campus.

References

External links

 Magway University on Facebook

Universities and colleges in Magway Region
Magway Region
Universities and colleges in Myanmar